The Karangura (Karanguru, Garanguru) were an indigenous Australian people of South Australia.

Country
Their eastern frontier is said to have been at Pandi Pandi. Their southern flank ran as far as the northern edge of Goyder Lagoon. They were also present at the Eleanor River.

Social organization
The Karanguru were constituted of some 14 hordes.

Alternative names
 Karangura
 Kararngura
 Kurangooroo
 Andrawilla.

Notes

Citations

Sources

Aboriginal peoples of South Australia